The discography of American rock band The J. Geils Band consists of 11 studio albums, three live albums, eight compilation albums, one video album, and 30 singles. Formed in 1967 in Worcester, Massachusetts, the band consisted of guitarist J. Geils, singer Peter Wolf, harmonica player Magic Dick, bassist Danny Klein, keyboard player Seth Justman, and drummer Stephen Jo Bladd. Their debut album, The J. Geils Band (1970), released by Atlantic Records, charted at number 195 on the United States Billboard 200. Their second album, The Morning After (1971), peaked at number 64 on the Billboard 200 and number 73 on Canada's Top Albums chart. It produced the single "Looking for a Love", which reached the top 40 in the US and in Canada.

Having expanded their fan base primarily from concerts, The J. Geils Band released their first live album, "Live" Full House, in 1972. It was their most commercially successful album yet, and was certified gold by the Recording Industry Association of America (RIAA). The band's third studio album, Bloodshot (1973), became their first top-ten album in the US and also received a gold certification from the RIAA. The album's lead single, "Give It to Me", peaked at number 30 in the US and number 39 in Canada. Ladies Invited followed in 1973 but failed to meet sales expectations. The J. Geils Band returned to the top 40 in 1974 with their fifth album, Nightmares...and Other Tales from the Vinyl Jungle, and the single "Must of Got Lost". However, the band's next two studio albums, Hotline (1975) and Monkey Island (1977), were commercial disappointments, and in 1978 the band left Atlantic Records for EMI.

Released in 1978, Sanctuary was the J. Geils Band's first album to receive gold certification from the RIAA since Bloodshot. The band's ninth album, Love Stinks (1980), produced two top 40 singles in the US and in Canada: "Come Back" and the title track. The album was certified platinum by Music Canada and gold by the RIAA. Freeze-Frame (1982) is the J. Geils Band's most commercially successful album. It reached the top 20 in several countries, and peaked at number one in the US and in Canada, where it was certified three times multi-platinum. "Centerfold", the album's first single, became an international hit and topped the charts in the US, Australia, and Canada. The album's title track also reached the top 10 in several countries. The band's commercial success continued with the live album Showtime! (1982), which was certified gold by the RIAA. Wolf left the band in 1983 over artistic differences and Justman assumed vocal duties for the band's 11th album, You're Gettin' Even While I'm Gettin' Odd (1984), which sold poorly. After disbanding in 1985, the J. Geils Band began performing again in 1999.

Albums

Studio albums

Live albums

Compilation albums

Video albums

Singles

Other appearances

See also
 List of artists who reached number one in the United States
 List of artists who reached number one on the Australian singles chart

Notes

References

External links
 The J. Geils Band at AllMusic
 
 

Rock music group discographies
Discographies of American artists